Clyde Kenneth Harris (April 18, 1918 – March 2, 1958) was an American soldier and interior decorator. He served as one of the "Monuments Men" during World War II and later married a granddaughter of Kaiser Wilhelm II.

Early life
Harris was born on April 18, 1918 in Maud, Oklahoma. He was the son of banker Van Buren Harris (1886–1974) and Aurora (née Vandevere) Harris (1891–1969) and grew up in Konawa, Oklahoma. 

Harris graduated with a degree in interior decoration from the University of Oklahoma in 1939, where he was president of the Sigma Alpha Epsilon fraternity, a member of Phi Eta Sigma, and secretary of Delta Phi Delta.  After earning his BFA, he was offered a scholarship to study in Paris, but instead attended the Parsons School of Design.

Career

In 1943, he enlisted in the United States Army Corps of Engineers, but was later assigned to the Monuments, Fine Arts, and Archives program. While working with the MFAA, he retrieved Holbein's Madonna from the dungeon of Coburg Castle. He was later sent to Wolfsgarten Castle to conduct interviews relating to the theft of the Hessen crown jewels (by, as it turned out, three Americans).

During the course of his investigation, he met Princess Cecilie Viktoria Anastasia Zeta Thyra Adelheid of Prussia, daughter of Crown Prince Wilhelm of Germany and granddaughter of Kaiser Wilhelm II. The two were married at Hohenzollern Castle on June 21, 1949. The pair settled in Amarillo, Texas, where Harris worked as an interior designer. Together, they were the parents of one daughter:

 Kira Alexandrine Harris (b. 1954)

Harris died of a cerebral hemorrhage at the age of 39 on March 2, 1958.  His widow died in 1975 while visiting family in Germany.

References

External links

Monuments men
1958 deaths
People from Konawa, Oklahoma
People from Amarillo, Texas
University of Oklahoma alumni
Parsons School of Design alumni
American interior designers
1918 births